Senator McKay may refer to:

David McKay (politician) (1844–1917), Utah State Senate
Douglas McKay (1893–1959), Oregon State Senate
Gordon W. McKay (1910–1990), Oregon State Senate
James Iver McKay (1793–1853), North Carolina State Senate
Thomas E. McKay (1875–1958), Utah State Senate

See also
Buddy MacKay (born 1933), Florida State Senate